Louise Abel may refer to:
 Louise Abel (photographer) (1841–1907), German-born Norwegian photographer
 Louise Abel (sculptor) (1894–1981), German-American sculptor and ceramist